Haberl is a surname. Notable people with the surname include:

Aladár Háberl (1898–1990), Hungarian skier
Charles G. Häberl (b. 1976), American professor
Franz Xaver Haberl (1840–1910), German musicologist
Raimund Haberl (b. 1949), Austrian rower
Luke Haberl (b. 1993), American scholar

See also
Jim Haberl Hut, an alpine hut located in Tantalus Range near Squamish, British Columbia
Häberli